Gawa may refer to:

Gawa, Elcho Island, Australia
Green Actors of West Africa, a network of environmental organisations 
Green and White Army, supporters of the Northern Ireland football team 
Guardians and Wards Act, an Act of the Parliament of India
-gawa, a suffix meaning "river" in place names in Japan

See also
Arabic coffee (Arabic: قهوة عربية, translit. qahwah arabiyya)